Anelpistus is a genus of false longhorn beetles in the family Stenotrachelidae. There are at least two described species in Anelpistus.

Species
These two species belong to the genus Anelpistus:
 Anelpistus americanus Horn, 1870
 Anelpistus canadensis Mank, 1942

References

Further reading

 

Tenebrionoidea
Articles created by Qbugbot